Nikiszowiec (German: Nikischschacht) is part of the Janów-Nikiszowiec administrative district of the city of Katowice.

History
Initially it was the settlement of the Giesche coal mine built on the land of Gieschewald manor (Giszowiec) between 1908–1918 by the mining – metallurgical concern initiative  Georg von Giesches Erben.  On 9 May 1924, the manor was liquidated, and Nikiszowiec and Giszowiec were incorporated into the Janów district.

In 1951 the district became a part of a new city – Szopienice, however, this decision was voided in 1960, when both Szopienice and Nikiszowiec were incorporated into Katowice.

The remnants of the original workers' housing estate familoks (specialized multi-family residences) comprise one of Poland's official national Historic Monuments (Pomnik historii), as designated January 28, 2011 and tracked by the National Heritage Board of Poland.

References 

Districts of Katowice
Planned communities in Poland